= Pragya Nagar =

- Colony
- Location in Bihar, India Pragya Nagar (India)
- Coordinates: 26.1007°N 85.3820°E
- Country: India
- State: Bihar
- District: Muzaffarpur

Languages
  - Official: Maithili, Hindi
- Time zone: UTC+5:30 (IST)
- Website: muzaffarpur.bih.nic.in

Pragya Nagar is a village in Muzaffarpur. Well-known teachers are residents. A religious tree named Malang Baba is located here.

== Geography ==
Pragya Nagar (Hindi: प्रज्ञा नगर) is located at 26.1007°N 85.3820°E.

== Transit ==
Ramdayalu Nagar Railway Station & Bus Stand.

== Educational institutes ==
- DAV Public School (School up to 10th Class)
- RDS College (Degree College)
- Central School (School up to 10th Class)
- SKJ Law College (College for LLB)
